The Law of Succession to the Headship of the State was the fifth of the eight Fundamental Laws of the Realm organizing the powers of the Francoist regime in Spain. It established provisions for the restoration of the Spanish monarchy (after being abolished by the Second Spanish Republic in 1931), appointed Francisco Franco as the Head of State of Spain for life. It provided that his successor would be proposed by Franco himself with the title of King or Regent of the Kingdom, but that would have to be approved by the Cortes Españolas.

The draft of the Law was sent by the Franco III Government to the Cortes on 28 March 1947. It had a short elaboration process and was approved by the Cortes in its session of 7 June 1947 and submitted to a referendum on 6 July 1947, coming into force on 27 July 1947.

Legal content 

The fundamental and key objects of the Law were:

1. Constituting Spain as the Kingdom and as a Catholic state (Article 1: "Spain, as a political unit, is a Catholic, social and representative State that, according to its tradition, is declared a Kingdom").

2. Converting the position of Head of State in a position for life in the person of Franco (Article 2: "The Head of State corresponds to the Leader of Spain and the Crusade, Generalissimo of the Armies, Don Francisco Franco Bahamonde").

3. Creating the Council of the Realm (Article 4).

4. Establishing the prerogative of the Head of State to propose to the Cortes, at any time, the person who should be called to succeed him, as a King or Regent and its possible revocation. (Article 6: "At any time the Head of State may propose to the Cortes the person he considers to be called to succeed him, as a King or Regent, with the conditions required by this Law, and may, likewise, submit to the approval of the former the revocation of the one proposed, even if it had already been accepted by the Cortes").

5. Defining and enumerating for the first time the body of the Fundamental Laws of the Realm that became a substitute for rigid constitution, whose repeal demanded the agreement of the Cortes and the confirmation by a referendum (Article 10).

The position of Infante Juan

The Manifesto of Lausanne 
In fact, he presented the constitutional monarchy as a moderate alternative to the regime, rejecting the Franco regime inspired by German and Italian totalitarian systems that have failed. He promised, in case of return to the monarchy, the approval of a new constitution, the recognition of human rights, the guarantee of public liberties, the establishment of a democratic legislative assembly, the recognition of the diversity, the amnesty of political prisoners and a fairer distribution of wealth.

It is for this reason that Franco hesitated to designate Infante Juan as a possible successor.

On 31 March 1947, the then undersecretary of the Presidency Luis Carrero Blanco, envoy of Francisco Franco and editor of the Law of Succession, informed Infante Juan that with the approval of the Law of Succession it would be Franco who would appoint the monarch of the kingdom "when he considers it convenient". He also told Infante Juan that he could be "King of Spain, but of Spain of the Movimiento Nacional, which is Catholic, anti-communist and anti-liberal".

The Manifesto of Estoril 
On 7 April 1947, Infante Juan published the Manifesto of Estoril (in Estoril, Portugal) in which he denounced the illegality of the Law of Succession, because it was proposed to alter the nature of the monarchy without consulting the heir to the throne.

Referendum 

On 6 July 1947 a referendum was held on the Law, in which, according to the official results, the electorate was composed of 16,187,992 voters. Of them, 14,454,426 voted, of which 12,628,983 (89.86% of the voters) voted affirmatively and 643,501 negatively.

Consequences 

From 18 July 1947, by virtue of the Law of Succession, Franco would act as the Head of State of the newly proclaimed Kingdom of Spain, whose throne was vacant and thus would have to remain so at least until the occurrence of what was later called the "succession event", a euphemism for the death of the dictator.

On 25 August 1948, Franco arranged a meeting with Infante Juan, on his holiday yacht , in the Bay of Biscay. There they agreed that Infante Juan's ten-year-old son, Juan Carlos, born and residing in Rome, Italy would change his residence and complete his education in Spain, along with his brother Alfonso, under the promise of "that the monarchist newspaper ABC could inform freely and that the restrictions of monarchist activities would be lifted".

On 9 November 1948 Juan Carlos was received by Franco at his residence in the Royal Palace of El Pardo, where he informed him that his education would be in charge of a group of professors with firm loyalty to the Movimiento Nacional.

As revealed by the documents declassified by the United States Department of State, due to an accident that occurred on 24 December 1961, during a hunt in the forests of El Pardo, Franco begun to consider the election of his succession. As report from the Greek royal court to the US ambassador in Greece indicates: "following a hunting accident" we are informed that "it is in planning to present the question of the royal succession before the Cortes in February. He has not divulged whether he will recommend the Count of Barcelona or his son, Juan Carlos"; conforming to what was indicated by the Spanish ambassador Luca de Tena.

Finally, on 22 July 1969, Franco designated Juan Carlos (skipping the natural order of succession that corresponded to his father Infante Juan under the law of succession according to which it would be Franco who would name the monarch of the kingdom) as his successor to the Headship of the State, with the title of "Prince of Spain". He was proclaimed as Franco's successor by the Cortes on the same day, when Juan Carlos took an oath of "fidelity to the principles of the National Movement and other Fundamental Laws of the Realm".

Aftermath 
During the dictatorship, as the Prince of Spain, Juan Carlos acted briefly (from 19 July to 2 September 1974) as the Head of State due to the fragile health of Franco because of Parkinson's disease.

Franco died on 20 November 1975, and Juan Carlos was proclaimed head of state and crowned as King of Spain on 22 November 1975 at the Palacio de las Cortes, with the regnal name Juan Carlos I, skipping the natural succession order (which corresponded to his father Infante Juan). Subsequent political reforms transformed the Francoist apparatus into a democratic system whose political form of government is the parliamentary monarchy, with a head of state that is subordinated to the constitution and where its acts have to be endorsed (the King reigns but does not govern), and a parliament elected by the people with which the legislative power rests.

It would not be until 14 May 1977 when Infante Juan officially renounced all his dynastic rights (which had been denied by the Law of Succession created by Franco) in favor of his son. The Law of Succession was repealed on 29 December 1978, more than a year and a half after the renouncement of Infante Juan.

References

External links 
 Ley de Sucesión en la Jefatura del Estado de 1947 (pdf) 
 Corrección de errata en dicha ley (pdf) 
 Ley de Sucesión en la Jefatura del Estado de 1947 
 Extracto del Manifiesto de Lausana (pdf) 

Politics of Spain
Law of Spain
Spanish monarchy
Francoist Spain
1947 in Spain
1947 in law
Legal history of Spain
Succession acts